Sei Es Drum is an extended play by Ricardo Villalobos. It was released in November 2007 on triple vinyl by Sei Es Drum, Ricardo Villalobos' own microhouse and minimal techno imprint. It was the label's first release. Despite its length, Sei Es Drum was marketed as an EP, and featured the full versions of several compositions featured on Villalobos' guest mix, Fabric 36. Like all of the releases on the Sei Es Drum label, Sei Es Drum was only released on vinyl.

Track listing

2007 EPs
Ricardo Villalobos albums
Techno EPs